The 2021 Major League Rugby Final was the third Major League Rugby championship match, held at the conclusion of the 4th season of the rugby union club competition in North America. It was played on August 1, 2021, at the Los Angeles Memorial Coliseum in Los Angeles, between the LA Giltinis and Rugby ATL.

Background

With the 2020 Major League Rugby season being cancelled due to the COVID-19 pandemic, there was no Championship match, or series, held in 2020. Instead, the Championship series returned for the 2021 season, which featured the arrival of the LA Giltinis, and the departure of the Colorado Raptors, leaving 12 teams to take part over two conferences; the East and West.

The format for the regular season ensured that the top two teams of each conference would compete in a Conference Final, with the victors of each taking part in the Championship Final. The regular season ended with the LA Giltinis and the Utah Warriors as the top two teams in the Western Conference, and Rugby ATL and Rugby United New York as the top two teams in the Eastern Conference. This marked the first time in MLR history that the Seattle Seawolves would not contest the Championship Final.

On July 24, Rugby ATL ground out a narrow win over RUNY, 10–9, to become the Eastern Conference Champions. They also became the first Eastern-based team to make it to the Championship Final (previous finals only had teams that would later be from the Western Conference.)

On July 25, LA Giltinis were able to secure the victory in the final few minutes, with a try by Ryan James in the closing 5 minutes.  Their 17–13 score means that they would become Western Conference Champions, the first time a debuting franchise would claim the title. This also ensured that the Championship Final would be contested against solely expansion franchises for the first time.

Venue

The venue was decided by which of the Conference Champions was ranked highest across both conferences. LA, with 63 points, ranked above Atlanta on 57, and held the home advantage for the Championship Final.

Broadcasting

The match was broadcast nationally on CBS. It averaged 478,000 viewers.

Match

Details